Lepetodrilidae is a family of small, deep-sea sea snails, hydrothermal vent limpets, marine gastropod mollusks in the clade Vetigastropoda (according to the taxonomy of the Gastropoda by Bouchet & Rocroi, 2005).

This family has no subfamilies.

Description
These deep-sea species are found and are endemic at hydrothermal vents. Their limpet-shaped shell consist of non-nacreous  aragonite. The thick periostracum covers the shell edge. The  apex is  posterior, in some species projecting posteriorly, and deflected to the right.  The shell has no sculpture or it consists of beads or imbricate radial  ribs. There is no operculum. The muscle scar forms the shape of a horseshoe.  The rhipidoglossate radula is special as the   lateral  teeth descend  toward  the  rachidian in a v-arrangement. The conspicuous penis is situated near the base of the right cephalic tentacle.

Genera 
Genera within the family Lepetodrilidae include:
 Clypeosectus McLean, 1989
 Gorgoleptis McLean, 1988
 Lepetodrilus McLean, 1988
 Pseudorimula McLean, 1989

References 

 McLean J. H. (1989). Contributions in Science, Natural History Museum of Los Angeles County 407: 15

External links